Murtaz Kalistratovich Khurtsilava (born 5 January 1943) is a former Georgian association football defender.

Khurtsilava was discovered while playing football in the school garden in Gegechkori, a small town in Caucasus – now known as Martvili – where he learned to play football with a ball made of hay and rags.

He was part of the USSR side that finished fourth at the 1966 FIFA World Cup, third at the 1972 Summer Olympics and second in the 1972 UEFA European Championship. After the UEFA Euro 1972 along with his teammates by Soviet Union national football team — Revaz Dzodzuashvili and Evgeni Rudakov — he was included in the team of the tournament, where also were presented such great players like Franz Beckenbauer, Gerd Müller, Paul Breitner, Uli Hoeness and Günter Netzer. He was also one of the only two Georgians, alongside Alexandre Chivadze, to have captained the Soviet Union national football team. At the club level he played for FC Dynamo Tbilisi.

After retiring in 1977, Khurtsilava set up his own business in Tbilisi, where he now resides with his family.

In November 2003, to celebrate UEFA's Jubilee, he was selected as the Golden Player of Georgia by the Georgian Football Federation as their most outstanding player of the past 50 years.

Honours
Dinamo Tbilisi
Soviet Top League: 1964

Soviet Union
Olympic Games bronze medal: 1972
UEFA European Championship runner-up: 1972

Individual
UEFA European Championship Team of the Tournament: 1972

References

External links
 UEFA.com – Georgia's Golden Player
 RussiaTeam biography 

1943 births
Living people
People from Samegrelo-Zemo Svaneti
Mingrelians
Soviet footballers
Footballers from Georgia (country)
UEFA Golden Players
Dynamo sports society athletes
1966 FIFA World Cup players
UEFA Euro 1968 players
1970 FIFA World Cup players
UEFA Euro 1972 players
Footballers at the 1972 Summer Olympics
Olympic footballers of the Soviet Union
Olympic bronze medalists for the Soviet Union
Soviet Union international footballers
Soviet Top League players
FC Dinamo Tbilisi players
FC Torpedo Kutaisi players
FC Dinamo Tbilisi managers
FC Zugdidi managers
Olympic medalists in football
Medalists at the 1972 Summer Olympics
Association football defenders
Soviet football managers
Football managers from Georgia (country)